The 2009–10 Australian Athletics Championships was the 88th edition of the national championship in outdoor track and field for Australia. It was held from 16–18 April 2010 at the Western Australian Athletics Stadium in Perth. It served as a selection meeting for Australia at the 2010 Commonwealth Games. The 10,000 metres event took place separately at the Zatopek 10K on 10 December 2009 at Lakeside Stadium in Melbourne. The decathlon and heptathlon competitions were held in Hobart on 13 and 14 February 2010.

Medal summary

Men

Women

References

External links 
 Athletics Australia website

2010
Australian Athletics Championships
Australian Championships
Athletics Championships
Sports competitions in Perth, Western Australia
2010s in Perth, Western Australia